The Central Luzon languages are a group of languages belonging to the Philippine languages. These are predominantly spoken in the western portions of Central Luzon in the Philippines. One of them, Kapampangan, is the major language of the Pampanga-Mount Pinatubo area. However, despite having three to four million speakers, it is threatened by the diaspora of its speakers after the June 1991 eruption of that volcano. Globalization also threatened the language, with the younger generation more on using and speaking Tagalog and English, but promotion and everyday usage boosted the vitality of Kapampangan.

External relationships
Ronald Himes (2012) and Lawrence Reid (2015) suggest that the Northern Mindoro languages may group with the Central Luzon languages. Both branches share the phonological innovation Proto-Austronesian *R > /y/.

Internal classification
The Central Luzon languages are:
Kapampangan
Sambalic
Abellen
Ambala
Bolinao
Botolan
Mag-antsi
Mag-indi
Mariveleño
Sambali
Sinauna

References

 
Philippine languages